Ansumane Faty Júnior (born 21 June 1991 in Bissau), known simply as Ansumane, is a Guinea-Bissauan professional footballer who plays for Portuguese club Gens Sport Clube as a striker.

References

External links

1991 births
Living people
Sportspeople from Bissau
Bissau-Guinean footballers
Association football forwards
Liga Portugal 2 players
Segunda Divisão players
CD Candal players
A.D. Nogueirense players
G.D. Ribeirão players
S.C. Freamunde players
U.D. Oliveirense players
F.C. Felgueiras 1932 players
Rebordosa A.C. players
S.C. Coimbrões players
A.D. Lousada players
Guinea-Bissau international footballers
Bissau-Guinean expatriate footballers
Expatriate footballers in Portugal
Bissau-Guinean expatriate sportspeople in Portugal